Gold Mountain is an unincorporated community in Plumas County, California. The 2010 United States census reported Gold Mountain's population was 80. For statistical purposes, the United States Census Bureau has defined Gold Mountain as a census-designated place (CDP).

Geography
According to the United States Census Bureau, the CDP covers an area of 6.1 square miles (15.8 km), all of it land. The census definition of the area may not precisely correspond to local understanding of the area with the same name.

Demographics

At the 2010 census Gold Mountain had a population of 80. The population density was 13.1 people per square mile (5.1/km). The racial makeup of Gold Mountain was 78 (97.5%) White, 0 (0.0%) African American, 1 (1.3%) Native American, 0 (0.0%) Asian, 0 (0.0%) Pacific Islander, 0 (0.0%) from other races, and 1 (1.3%) from two or more races.  Hispanic or Latino of any race were 0 people (0.0%).

The whole population lived in households, no one lived in non-institutionalized group quarters and no one was institutionalized.

There were 41 households, 2 (4.9%) had children under the age of 18 living in them, 31 (75.6%) were opposite-sex married couples living together, 1 (2.4%) had a female householder with no husband present, 1 (2.4%) had a male householder with no wife present.  There were 1 (2.4%) unmarried opposite-sex partnerships, and 0 (0%) same-sex married couples or partnerships. 7 households (17.1%) were one person and 4 (9.8%) had someone living alone who was 65 or older. The average household size was 1.95.  There were 33 families (80.5% of households); the average family size was 2.12.

The age distribution was 2 people (2.5%) under the age of 18, 2 people (2.5%) aged 18 to 24, 3 people (3.8%) aged 25 to 44, 39 people (48.8%) aged 45 to 64, and 34 people (42.5%) who were 65 or older.  The median age was 63.7 years. For every 100 females, there were 110.5 males.  For every 100 females age 18 and over, there were 110.8 males.

There were 87 housing units at an average density of 14.3 per square mile, of the occupied units 39 (95.1%) were owner-occupied and 2 (4.9%) were rented. The homeowner vacancy rate was 4.9%; the rental vacancy rate was 33.3%.  77 people (96.3% of the population) lived in owner-occupied housing units and 3 people (3.8%) lived in rental housing units.

Politics

References

Census-designated places in Plumas County, California
Census-designated places in California